One Child is a 2014 BBC and Sundance TV drama miniseries. Following its initial two-night premiere on Sundance TV, it aired as part of the BBC's China season in 2016, where it was shown over three sixty-minute episodes. The series follows a girl called Mei Ashley (Katie Leung) who discovers that she has a brother, Li Jun (Sebastian So), that she never knew about and that he is due to be sentenced to death for a murder he did not commit.

Cast
Katie Leung as Mei Ashley, a girl who finds she has a brother.
Donald Sumpter as Jim Ashley, Mei's adoptive father.
Elizabeth Perkins as Katherine Ashley, Mei's adoptive mother.
Mardy Ma as Liu Ying, Mei's biological mother.
Sebastian So as Li Jun, Mei's brother.
Linh Dan Pham as Pan Qianyi, a journalist.
Junix Inocian as Lin Zhouqing, a private detective.  
Harry Wong as Guan Xiaopeng, the murderer.
Selina Lo as Xu Lian, witness to the murder.

Episodes
One Child aired in sixty-minute episodes for its UK release, but originally aired in ninety-minute episodes as a two-night special event. For its digital release on streaming platforms, it has retained the three-episode format presented here.

Filming
One Child is set in Guangzhou but was filmed in Hong Kong and Britain, as under Chinese law before anything is filmed all scripts have to be approved by the Chinese government but this law does not apply in Hong Kong as it is an administrative region.

References

External links

Production website at SundanceTV

2010s British drama television series
2016 British television series debuts
2016 British television series endings
BBC television dramas
BBC Television shows
English-language television shows
Guangzhou
Television shows set in China